Prospect Heights may refer to:

Prospect Heights, Colorado
 Prospect Heights, Illinois
 Prospect Heights, New Jersey
 Prospect Heights, Brooklyn, New York